For information about the conductivity-temperature-depth (CTD) instrument, see: CTD (instrument).

A rosette sampler (also known as a CTD-rosette or carousel) is a device used for water sampling in deep water. Rosette samplers are used in the ocean and large inland water bodies such as the North American Great Lakes in order to investigate quality. Rosette samplers are a key piece of equipment in oceanography and have been used to collect information over many years in repeat hydrographic surveys.

Description 
A rosette sampler is made of an assembly of 12 to 36 sampling bottles. Each bottle is a volume that range from a minimum value of 1.2 L to a maximum value of 30 L. All of them constitutes the rosette sampler and are clustered around a cylinder situated in the center of the assembly, where there is a sensing system called Sea-Bird or CTD, that stands for "Conductivity, Temperature and Depth", although other variables can be measured by modern CTDs (e.g. water turbidity, dissolved oxygen concentration, chlorophyll concentration and pH).

The apparatus is attached to a wire rope. A winch on board of the boat unrolls the rope during descent and rolls up it during the ascent (i.e. at the end of the samples collection). During operations in the ocean, a rosette sampler can approach the seabed at a distance from 1 to 5 m, depending on the particular sea conditions.

The opening of each sampling bottle can be automatic (by reaching a certain depth) or manual (by operator, remotely).

Applications 
Water sampling is used in general for chemical analysis and ecotoxicological assessment.

A rosette sampler is preferred to Winchester sampler for collection of water sampling at depths greater than 50 m.

References

Bibliography 
 U.S. Environmental Protection Agency, "Field Sampling Using the Rosette Sampler"

Water management
Water pollution
Oceanography
Limnology
Oceanographic instrumentation
Water and the environment
Hydrography